Sindicato de Empleados Publicos de San Juan is an Argentinian UCI Continental cycling team established in 2013.

Team roster

Doping
In May 2018, Gonzalo Najar tested positive for the third-generation EPO-based blood booster CERA on January 21 - the day of the opening stage of the 2018 Vuelta a San Juan.

Major results
2015
Stage 4 Vuelta Ciclista del Uruguay, Laureano Rosas

2016
Stage 8 Vuelta Ciclista del Uruguay, Laureano Rosas 
 National Time Trial Championships, Laureano Rosas

2017
 National Road Race Championships, Gonzalo Najar
 National Time Trial Championships, Mauricio Muller
 National Time Trial Championships, Ignacio de Jesús Prado

2018
Stage 5 Vuelta a San Juan Internacional, Gonzalo Najar

References

External links

UCI Continental Teams (America)
Cycling teams established in 2013
Cycling teams based in Argentina
2013 establishments in Argentina